Gabrielle Bossis (1874–1950) was a French Catholic laywoman, nurse, playwright, actress and mystic, best known for her mystical work Lui et Moi, published in a very abridged English translation as He and I. The book recounts her dialogues with Jesus, which came to her as an "inner voice" and which she recorded in a series of journals from 1936 to shortly before her death in 1950. Some sample thoughts of the book are:

1. Express Your hope in me. Come out of yourself. Enter into Me.
2. Do not fail to give Me your sufferings. They help sinners.
3. I asked you to wake up in the arms of the Father because each one of your mornings is a new creation.
4. I asked you to fall asleep in the Holy Spirit because your last conscious breath should be in love.
5. Try to understand My yearning for you, for all My children.
6. You see that you can do nothing by yourself. Throw yourself into My arms every morning and ask Me for strength to pay attention to the little details. Life is made up of little things, you know. Don't count on yourself any more. Count on me.
7. When the love of the cross sinks deep into a person, he lives in a joy that the world can never know. For the world has only pleasures, but joy belongs to Me and Mine, My friend.

References

1874 births
1950 deaths
20th-century Christian mystics
20th-century French nuns
French Christian mystics
Roman Catholic mystics